Jack Womack (born January 8, 1956) is an American author of fiction and speculative fiction.

Womack was born in Lexington, Kentucky, and now lives in New York City with his wife and daughter. "Yeah, I was in Kentucky. Lived there till I was 21, moved up here, and I've lived in my present apartment for 32 years in April."

Bibliography
"Dryco" series, in order of the series timeline:
 Random Acts of Senseless Violence (1995) 
 Heathern (1990) 
 Ambient (1987) 
 Terraplane (1988) 
 Elvissey (1993)  (Philip K. Dick Award, 1993)
 Going, Going, Gone (2000) 

Other novels:
 Let's Put the Future Behind Us (1996) 

Short stories:
"That Old School Tie" (1994) in Little Deaths (ed. Ellen Datlow)
"Audience" (1997) in The Horns of Elfland (ed. Ellen Kushner, Delia Sherman, and Donald G. Keller)

Nonfiction:
Flying Saucers Are Real! (2016)

References

External links
 .
 Paul McAuley and Jack Womack: A Double Interview
 "Jack Womack: Going, Going, Gone"; interview with Cory Doctorow, The WELL, August 1, 2001
 Interview with Rhizome.org, December 7, 2011
 Interview with Starburstmagazine.com, August 2016
 "THE STRANGE HISTORY OF UFO SIGHTINGS IS MORE BIZARRE THAN YOU'D EXPECT" with Milk, August 2, 2016

1956 births
Living people
20th-century American novelists
American male novelists
American science fiction writers
Date of birth missing (living people)
Writers from Lexington, Kentucky
20th-century American male writers
Novelists from Kentucky